The Drover's Wife: The Legend of Molly Johnson is a 2021 Australian revisionist Western / Australian Western drama film written and directed by Leah Purcell, who also stars in the eponymous role. It also stars Rob Collins, Sam Reid and Jessica De Gouw. The film premiered at the South by Southwest (SXSW) film festival on 18 March 2021 and opened across Australia on 5 May 2022.

Plot
The film opens with a scene in which Molly Johnson, heavily pregnant, shoots a stray bull which has wandered near her home, after ensuring that her four children are safe. Shortly afterwards the new sergeant of the district, Sergeant Klintoff, turns up with his sickly wife, Louisa, asking if they could share some of the meat that they smelt cooking, as they had lost all of their provisions when crossing the river. She gives them food in exchange for their taking her children to the settlement for safekeeping while her new baby is born.

Cast
 Leah Purcell as Molly Johnson, the drover's wife
 Rob Collins as Yadaka
 Sam Reid as Sergeant Klintoff
 Jessica De Gouw as Louisa Klintoff, the sergeant's wife
 Malachi Dower-Roberts as Danny Johnson, Molly's eldest son

Origin
The plot is a reworking of Henry Lawson's 1892 short story The Drover's Wife, but deviates significantly from the original story as developed in Purcell's earlier award-winning play and novel of the same name. It tells the story of a woman living with her children in an isolated location in the High Country in the colony of New South Wales near the border of the colony of Victoria.

Purcell reimagines Lawson's story through an Indigenous feminist lens, inspired by her own lived experience and the stories of her ancestors. The character of Yadaka was inspired by Purcell's great-grandfather, Tippo Charlie Chambers.

Production
The story is set in the Snowy Mountains and much of the filming was done there, mostly around Adaminaby. Cinematography was by Mark Wareham.

It is Purcell's debut film as director and writer. It is the first Australian feature film to be written and directed by an Indigenous woman who also stars in the lead role. Her husband, Bain Stewart, is lead producer and executive producer on the film.

The original soundtrack is by Salliana Seven Campbell.

Release

After being delayed by the COVID-19 pandemic, the film had its world premiere at South by Southwest (SXSW) on 18 March 2021. It also screened at the Warsaw International Film Festival, Cinefest Oz, the Melbourne International Film Festival, the Brisbane International Film Festival and the Sydney Film Festival before being released in Australian cinemas on 5 May 2022 and in the UK on 13 May 2022.

International distribution is handled by Memento Films International.

Reception

The film opened to generally positive reviews. The acting, cinematography and Salliana Seven Campbell's score were praised by several critics.

 Rotten Tomatoes has a "Fresh" score of 80%.

Accolades
At the Asia Pacific Screen Awards, The Drover's Wife won the Jury Grand Prix and Purcell was nominated for the Best Actress award.

The film was also a nominee for the following awards:

Cinefest Oz Film Prize
Sydney Film Festival, Best Film
Warsaw International Film Festival, Best Film, International Competition

Awards

References

Further reading

External links

2021 films
2021 Western (genre) films
Australian Western (genre) films
Films about Aboriginal Australians
Films about racism
Films set in the Outback
2020s feminist films
2020s English-language films